The Finnish national road 58 is the main road from Kangasala to Kärsämäki via Orivesi, Jämsä, Keuruu, Karstula, Kinnula and Haapajärvi. The road is also called Suomenselkätie and has been marketed as an alternative road connection to Highways 4 and 9. In the 1938 road numbering system, main road 58 was the road between Lahti and Padasjoki, but after the completion of the Helsinki–Lahti road, Highway 4 switched to Lahti and road number 58 was taken out of service. In the mid-1970s, however, it was reopened on the road between Orivesi and Keuruu.

The road is a two-lane road all the way, the quality of which varies greatly; only the section between Orivesi and Keuruu is at the highway level. Other sections are former regional roads, which in many places are considerably narrow, winding and hilly as main roads. The road also passes through several small urban areas. The road is only partially permanently paved, between Keuruu and Reisjärvi the road is mostly lightly paved. On the other hand, road traffic volumes are mainly quite low, especially north of Keuruu. In addition, the road has a total of up to 13 discontinuities, where the main road turns at the junction. Between Multia and Pylkönmäki, main road 58 is marked in the Central Finland's regional plan for the new alignment, and regional road 636 between Pylkönmäki and Karstula will be converted into main road 58. The section between Kinnula and Reisjärvi has been marked for shortening in the new guidelines in the regional plans of Central Finland and North Ostrobothnia.

Route 

The road passes through the following localities:

See also
 Finnish national road 4

References

External links

 Matti Grönroos: Kantatie 58 (in Finnish)

Roads in Finland